The citrine canary-flycatcher (Culicicapa helianthea) is a species of bird in the family Stenostiridae. The term citrine refers to its yellowish colouration.  It is found in Sulawesi and the Philippines. Its natural habitat is subtropical or tropical moist montane forests.

References

citrine canary-flycatcher
Birds of the Philippines
Birds of Sulawesi
citrine canary-flycatcher
Taxonomy articles created by Polbot